Ecology of Souls is the debut album of Kenneth Newby, released in 1993 through Songlines Recordings.

Track listing

Personnel 
Janet Brook – voice
Ann Hepper – percussion
Andreas Kahre – percussion, voice
Chris Miller – percussion, prepared piano
Kenneth Newby – suling gambuh, siter, cymbal, production, mixing, recording
Michael O'Neill – percussion
Tony Reif – production
Matt Rogalsky – percussion
Lorraine Thomson – cover art

References

External links 
 

1993 albums
Kenneth Newby albums